Kuvyon II (Shekarau Angyu Masa-Ibi; 1937 – 10 October 2021) was the 27th Aku Uka (paramount ruler) of Kwararafa and  13th since the founding of the Wukari Federation, a Jukun tradition state in Middle Belt, Nigeria. He is also the Chairman, Taraba State Council of Traditional Rulers and Chancellor, Federal University Dutse. He died on October 10, 2021 at the age of 84.

Working career
Kuvyon II was, as of March 1961, a Personal Assistant to the Executive Officer in the Ministry of Animal Health, Kaduna and then became a Personal Assistant to the Parliamentary Secretary, Northern Region. He got transferred to Lagos as Personal Assistant to the Chairman, Electricity Corporation of Nigeria (ECN) in 1963, and finally retired from civil service after the January 1966 Military Coup to start a business enterprise in Makurdi, later a part of Benue-Plateau State.

Enthronement
Masa-Ibi was crowned Kuvyon II at Byepi, in 1976 as the 27th monarch of Kwararafa and the 13th from the founding of the Wukari Federation. The 40th anniversary of his ascendancy to the throne was marked on Friday 17th and Saturday 18 March 2017, at the Kwararafa University permanent site, Wukari. Masa-Ibi died on October 10, 2021 after a brief illness. 

As regards the prolonged land dispute between the Jukun and Tiv, Kuvyon II in August 2020 was said to have related the issue with a prolonged unresolved boundary adjustment.

Personal life
As reported by PSR Magazine, Kuvyon II had been husband to Ayondo Kande Masa-Ibi (née Manu Aju Finshi) since 1961, and the couple have ten children and also blessed with grandchildren.

References

Nigerian traditional rulers
People from Taraba State
Kwararafa monarchs
1937 births
2021 deaths